Athol is a historic slave manor and rectory located in Columbia (Simpsonville), Howard County, Maryland, U.S.

History

Athol Manor was built as the neighboring rectory of the Christ Church Guilford, which was built on the site of a 1711 burned church which was rebuilt. Edmund Lord Bishop of London sent  Viscount of Oxenford, James MacGill to administer a chapel of ease in Queen Caroline Parish in Anne Arundel County. (later broke off to become Howard County.) On 17 August 1732, King Charles granted  to James MacGill to form a new Church of England in the Maryland Colony. The patent was titled "Athol" after MacGill's home in Scotland. The title named the county "Winkepin", a reference to the future Wincopin plantation. "Williams Lot", "Scantlings Lot", and "Brown's Hopyard" were combined into a new  patent named "Athole Enlarged" on 29 September 1763.  MacGill brought laborers from Scotland and local slaves to construct the granite building where he raised eleven children with his wife Sarah Hilleary. Construction on Athole started in 1732, and finished by 1740. A side addition was built in 1768. A steep roof and door size windows were built to minimize taxes to Britain on certain features. A square cupola was added, and later removed due to deterioration. A conservatory was constructed in the 1980s.

In 1776, the American Revolutionary War caused the cutoff from the Church of England. The property was contested among the MacGill heirs until sold to John Hathaway in 1821 for $3,944.50. In 1866 the house was the residence of Richard Gambrill MacGill. Subsequent owners included Nehemiah Moxley Sr, whose descendants would serve as county commissioner and subdivider of large tracts of Howard County to form the Columbia development. In 1927, the estate was conveyed by James Clark to local newspaper magnate Paul Griffith Stromberg. From 1927 to 1946 the Melvin Coar family occupied the house who added electricity, plumbing and central heating. Tom and Edwina Dike maintained the house until 1986 as Columbia was built on subdivisions of the land.

The site with a stone marker labeled Athol 1730, was purchased by the Rouse Company. Two Gravesites located on the estate were moved for residential development, gravesites to the east had tombstones removed without bodies re-interred before development. A 1997 historical survey recommending the property for National Historic Register status for significant contributions to history, Architecture and artistic merit. The recommendation was denied by the office of preservation services. All but one pre-colonial structures in the limits of the planned community of Columbia have been denied historic status. Martin Road Park was formed out of a small tract adjacent to the manor home.

References

External links
List of Howard County properties in the Maryland Historical Trust
Simpsonville, Maryland
Freetown, Maryland
Athol, Catonsville - The Gundry Sanatorium.

Houses completed in 1740
Houses in Howard County, Maryland
Howard County, Maryland landmarks
Buildings and structures in Columbia, Maryland
1740 establishments in Maryland